Stillson may refer to:

Blanche Stillson (1889–1977), American artist and author
Daniel Chapman Stillson (1826-1899), American inventor of the Pipe wrench
Greg Stillson, antagonist in Stephen King's 1979 novel The Dead Zone